An annular solar eclipse occurred at the Moon's ascending node of the orbit on Monday, January 26, 2009. A solar eclipse occurs when the Moon passes between Earth and the Sun, thereby totally or partly obscuring the image of the Sun for a viewer on Earth. An annular solar eclipse occurs when the Moon's apparent diameter is smaller than the Sun's, blocking most of the Sun's light and causing the Sun to look like an annulus (ring). An annular eclipse appears as a partial eclipse over a region of the Earth thousands of kilometres wide.
It had a magnitude of 0.9282 and was visible from a narrow corridor beginning in the south Atlantic Ocean and sweeping eastward 900 km south of Africa, slowly curving northeast through the Indian Ocean.  Its first landfall was in the Cocos Islands followed by southern Sumatra and western Java.  It continued somewhat more easterly across central Borneo, across the northwestern edge of Celebes, then ending just before Mindanao, Philippines. The duration of annularity at greatest eclipse lasted 7 minutes, 53.58 seconds, but at greatest duration lasted 7 minutes, 56.05 seconds.

Occurring only 3.3 days after apogee (January 23, 2009), the Moon's apparent diameter was smaller.

Visibility
Animated path

Images
Progression from Colombo, Sri Lanka

Related eclipses

Eclipses of 2009 
 An annular solar eclipse on January 26.
 A penumbral lunar eclipse on February 9.
 A penumbral lunar eclipse on July 7.
 A total solar eclipse on July 22.
 A penumbral lunar eclipse on August 6.
 A partial lunar eclipse on December 31.

Tzolkinex 
 Preceded: Solar eclipse of December 14, 2001
 Followed: Solar eclipse of March 9, 2016

Half-Saros 
 Preceded: Lunar eclipse of January 21, 2000
 Followed: Lunar eclipse of January 31, 2018

Tritos 
 Preceded: Solar eclipse of February 26, 1998
 Followed: Solar eclipse of December 26, 2019

Solar Saros 131 
 Preceded: Solar eclipse of January 15, 1991
 Followed: Solar eclipse of February 6, 2027

Inex 
 Preceded: Solar eclipse of February 16, 1980
 Followed: Solar eclipse of January 5, 2038

Triad 
 Preceded: Solar eclipse of March 28, 1922
 Followed: Solar eclipse of November 27, 2095

Solar eclipses 2008–2011

Saros 131

Metonic series

Notes

References
 Annular Solar Eclipse of 2009 Jan 26, F. Espenak, NASA’s GSFC PDF

Photos:
 Spaceweather.com eclipse gallery
 Photos of solar eclipse around the world
 Annular solar eclipse in Indonesia
  Astronomy Picture of the Day, January 28, 2009, A Partial Eclipse Over Manila Bay, Philippines

2009 1 26
2009 in science
2009 01 26
January 2009 events